Joseph Allen (30 December 1909 – October 1978) was a professional footballer who played for Northfleet, Tottenham Hotspur, Queens Park Rangers, Mansfield Town; Racing Club de Roubaix and FC Nancy.

Football career 
Allen played for local club Bilsthorpe Colliery before joining Tottenham Hotspur for his first spell at White Hart Lane in 1932. 

In the same year he moved to the Spurs nursery club Northfleet United on loan. The inside forward rejoined the Lilywhites where he scored one goal in his solitary match for the club. A 1-1 draw with Bradford City at White Hart Lane in April 1933, in a season where Tottenham would be promoted from the old Second Division.

In 1933 he signed for Queens Park Rangers where he went on to feature in 51 matches and scoring on six occasions for the Loftus Road outfit. 

Allen moved to Mansfield Town and competed in a further eight games and netting five goals. 

He ended his career in France playing for RC Roubaix and then FC Nancy.

References

1909 births
1978 deaths
People from Bilsthorpe
Footballers from Nottinghamshire
English footballers
English Football League players
Tottenham Hotspur F.C. players
Queens Park Rangers F.C. players
Mansfield Town F.C. players
RC Roubaix players
FC Nancy players
Ligue 1 players
Ligue 2 players
Association football forwards